The Life On ice: Robotic Antarctic eXplorer or LORAX is an experimental robotics project being developed by the Robotics Institute of Carnegie Mellon University, supported by NASA. The intent of the project is to create an autonomous rover to survey the distribution of microbes on Antarctica's ice sheets. It is unknown whether it intentionally shares a name with The Lorax, the environmentalist Dr. Seuss character.

The goal is to create a robotic platform with full navigational autonomy and clean, sustainable power systems. This complete isolation will allow the robot to operate unattended and avoid any possible contamination of its results. The project aims for the robot to be able to operate for one month without human intervention. The rover's power systems incorporate a combination of solar power and wind power. Several solar panels are mounted on the shell of the rover. It also has a deployable wind turbine for generating further power.

A working model of the LORAX rover called Nomad was tested in 2005 on the frozen Mascoma Lake in New Hampshire. The rover completed a ten kilometer test run, traversed ice obstacles and conducted a successful test of its wind turbine. The rover, independent of any human guidance, traveled over fourteen kilometers in all on the frozen lake and returned to its starting point. The test also yielded further calibrations to many of the rover's systems.

See also 
 Scarab (rover)

References

Notes

Sources

External links 
 Project Page at the Robotics Institute
 Project page featuring test results, images and movies

Carnegie Mellon University
Planetary rovers
Robots of the United States
2005 robots
Four-wheeled robots